

Players

Squad information

Transfers in

Transfers out

Contract extensions

Managerial staff

Squad statistics

Competitions

W-League

League table

Results summary

Results by round

Fixtures
 Click here for season fixtures.

References

External links
 Official Website

Newcastle Jets FC (A-League Women) seasons
Newcastle Jets